Gabhaji Mangaji Thakor (koli) is an Indian politician and was a member of Ninth and Tenth Lok Sabha. He was also a former member of Gujarat Legislative Assembly representing Dehgam assembly constituency of Gandhinagar district.

References

External links
 http://eci.nic.in/GE2004_Affidavits/gujarat/11/GabhajiMangajiThakor/GabhajiMangajiThakor.html
 http://www.outlookindia.com/elections/loksabha/2004/gujarat/gandhinagar/asarwa

1933 births
India MPs 1989–1991
India MPs 1991–1996
Gujarat MLAs 1985–1990
Gujarat MLAs 1998–2002
Bharatiya Janata Party politicians from Gujarat
Politicians from Ahmedabad
Indian agriculturalists
Living people
Lok Sabha members from Gujarat